Senneterre is a town in the Abitibi-Témiscamingue region of northwestern Quebec, Canada. It is in the Vallée-de-l'Or Regional County Municipality. The town's territory includes a vast undeveloped area stretching from the Bell River to the Mauricie region.

There are three schools in this city: St-Paul elementary school, Chanoine-Delisle elementary school and La Concorde High school. This town centre is mainly surrounded by Parent Lake and Tiblemont Lake. The main street of this city is called Avenue 10e (10th Avenue). The arena is named Centre sportif André Dubé. The economy of this city is mainly based on forestry.

History
While the site first served as a trading post, real colonization began in 1904 when the first permanent settlers arrived. It was first identified as Rivière-Nottaway, then Rivière-Bell. Over the next 10 years, there were only a few residents who were joined by people fleeing conscription. Between 1911 and 1913 when the National Transcontinental Railway was being constructed, the area was surveyed and the geographic township of Senneterre was formed, named in honour of a captain of the Régiment de Languedoc that fought in the Battle of Sainte-Foy.

The completion of the railway accelerated the development of the place. In 1914, the Parish of Saint-Paul-de-Senneterre was founded, and in 1919, the place was incorporated as the Township Municipality of Senneterre-Partie-Ouest, named after the township and its relative position therein. It developed into a center for forestry, commerce and tourism.

In 1948, it shortened its name to Senneterre and changed status to village municipality, while gaining town status in 1956. In 1953, CFS Senneterre opened, home to the No. 34 Aircraft Control & Warning Squadron and part of the Pinetree Line chain of radar stations. After the closure of CFS Val-d'Or in 1976, the base also served as the Search and Rescue centre for north-western Quebec. In 1988, CFS Senneterre was closed.

From that day until La Tuque's amalgamation in 2002, it was in terms of area the second largest incorporated entity in Quebec after Baie-James and the largest with town status in Quebec.

City council

 Mayor: Nathalie-Ann Pelchat
 Councillors: Louise Allaire-Boucher, Carole Chantal, Sylvie Des Roberts, André Lévesque, René Paquin, Simon Roy

Communities
In addition to Senneterre centre, the town's territory includes the following hamlets or rail stops, all located along the Canadian National Railway:
 Forsyth
 Gagnon-Siding
 Langlade
 Monet
 Paradis
 Press

Demographics 

According to the 2016 Canadian Census:
Mother tongue:
 English as first language: 0.5%
 French as first language: 95.2%
 English and French as first language: 0.9%
 Other as first language: 3.4%

Population trend:
 Population in 2011: 2953 (2006 to 2011 population change: -1.3%)
 Population in 2006: 2993
 Population in 2001: 3275
 Population total in 1996: 3535
 Senneterre (ville): 3488
 Matchi-Manitou (Unorganized): 241
 Population in 1991:
 Senneterre (ville): 3563
 Matchi-Manitou (Unorganized): 240

Transportation

The town is served by Via Rail Canada’s Montreal–Senneterre route, with Senneterre station being the terminal. The train leaves Montreal Central Station toward Senneterre every Monday, Wednesday and Friday, and returns to Montreal on Tuesday, Thursday and Sunday.

Two highways, Route 113 and Route 386, connects the town with the rest of Quebec, with the former connecting to the Trans-Canada Highway (Route 117 in Quebec).

References

External links

 Ville de Senneterre 

Cities and towns in Quebec
Incorporated places in Abitibi-Témiscamingue
Hudson's Bay Company trading posts